Cryptovision Records is  a New York City based independent record label that was founded by musicians James Talley, Mike Linn, Brian Beggs, and Gene Wood in 1979 and dissolved in 1990. In 2009 Dave Amels, A&R man for the original Cryptovision Records, restarted the record label in New Jersey as Cryptovision Records LLC.

Cryptovision Records helped start the career of Sam Coomes with his group The Donner Party. Coomes went on to form Quasi and play guitar for Elliott Smith.

Cryptovision Records' debut release for their restart of the record label in 2009 is Dennis Diken with Bell Sound - "Late Music".

Discography

Singles and EPs 
 Deprogrammers - Midas Touch/Grim Reaper - 1981 - 7" - C-1001
 Stepford Husbands - Why Aren't You There/Yeah - 1984 - 7" - BR-1000-11-1
 Deprogrammers - Fear Of Success - 1985 - 12" - CR-2001
 Stepford Husbands - Rode Out/Seeing is Believing - 1985 - 7" - CR-300
 Flying Color - Look My Way/Dear Friend - 1985 - 7" - CR-400
 Desolation Angels - Border Patrol/Poison Streets - 1985 - 7" - CR-500
 Distraction Boys - Pay Off the Cops/Have a Nice Day/Home on the Missile Range - 1985 - 7" - CR-600
 Mod Fun - Mary Goes Round/Grounded - 1986 - 7" - CR-700
 Optic Nerve - Ain't That a Man/Mayfair/Happy Ever After - 1986 - 7" - CR-800
 Optic Nerve - Leaving Yesterday Behind/Kiss Her Goodbye - 1987 - 7" - CR-810
 Stepford Husbands - Seems Like Years/Kwik Way - 1988 - 7" - CR-310
 Black Orchids - Lunatics Ball - 1988 - 7" - CR-900
 Contact Obsession - Because It Seemed/The Other Side/The Same Obsession - 1989 - 7" - CR-1100
 Sultrees - Take Me As I Am/Contrails - 1990 - 7" - CR-1000
 Stepford Husbands - Building of Love For Sale/Bag Man/Tick Tock - 1990 - 7" - CR-320

Albums 
 The Lyon in Winter - As Winter Falls - 1986 - 12" - CRL-1300
 Mod FunMod Fun MySpace - Dorothy's Dream - 1986 - 12" - CRL-1000
 Various Artists - Please Don't Adjust Your Set... - 1986 - 12" - CRL-1100
 The Stepford Husbands - New Ways of Seeing - 1987 - 12" - CRL-1200
 The Donner Party - Donner Party - 1987 - 12" - CRL-1400
 The Corvairs - Rio Blanco - 1987 - 12" - CRL-1600
 Hector Penalosa - Hector - 1988 - 12" - CRL-1700
 Various Artists - Havoc from Holland - 1989 - 12" - CRL-1800
 Dennis Diken with Bell Sound - Late Music - 2009 - CD - CRC-3000

See also
List of record labels

References

External links
Official site
Review by Bill Kopp
New Retro-Rock with Dennis Diken 
Modern Guitars

Pop record labels
Garage rock record labels
American independent record labels
Record labels established in 1979
Record labels disestablished in 1990
Record labels established in 2009
Re-established companies
Rock and roll record labels